James Alexander Dewar (February 5, 1897 – June 30, 1985) was a Canadian inventor known for inventing the Twinkie in 1931.

Career
Dewar began his career in 1920 at the Continental Baking Company that later, through a series of mergers and acquisitions, became Hostess Brands. He started as a delivery boy by delivering pastries by horse-drawn cart. Dewar eventually rose up through the ranks to be a plant manager.

In 1931, Dewar's plant was making strawberry shortcakes, but only during strawberry season. Dewar came up with an idea to create a shortcake with cream on the inside instead of strawberries. Having seen a billboard for a shoe company called the "Twinkle Toe Shoe Co.", he was inspired to call his shortcake invention a "Twinkie".

Dewar rose to be regional vice-president at Hostess and held that position until 1972.

Personal life
James Dewar was born on February 5, 1897, in Pugwash River, Nova Scotia. As a young man, Dewar worked on boats shipping timber and limestone, arriving in Chicago on a laker.

Dewar had 4 kids with one of them being Cleveland Browns half-back James Dewar Jr. Dewar had a total of 15 grandchildren as well. Dewar also said he would give his kids and grandchildren Twinkies regularly, though he said that it never affected any of their health. Some people said that Dewar had at least 3 twinkies and a glass of milk before he went to bed though that was never confirmed nor denied by Dewar.

Dewar died on June 30, 1985, in Downers Grove, Illinois, at the age of 88 and at the time was survived by 2 daughters, 15 grandchildren, and 17 great-grandchildren.

References

External links

1897 births
1985 deaths
20th-century Canadian inventors
People from Cook County, Illinois
People from Downers Grove, Illinois
20th-century Canadian businesspeople
People from Cumberland County, Nova Scotia
Burials in Illinois